Terrance Smith (born May 3, 1993) is an American football linebacker for the Orlando Guardians of the XFL. He was most recently a member of the Ottawa Redblacks of the Canadian Football League (CFL). He played college football at Florida State. He was signed by the Kansas City Chiefs as an undrafted free agent after the 2016 NFL Draft.

High school career
Smith attended Southwest Dekalb High School in Decatur, Georgia. As a junior, he recorded 120+ tackles, 15 sacks and 15 tackles-for-loss. As a senior, he recorded 60 tackles and 10 sacks in just nine games. He was rated a three-star prospect by Rivals.com, their 18th overall outside linebacker. He was rated four-stars  and ranked the 21st overall defensive end by Scout.com. 247Sports.com rated him a three-star recruit, he was also ranked the 26th overall outside linebacker by ESPN. He was #27 on the SuperPrep Georgia 83, #34 on The Atlanta Journal-Constitutions top 50 recruits list. While at Southwest Dekalb, he also was a sprinter/jumper on the school's track & field team.

College career
Smith then attended Florida State University where he majored in social science. As a true freshman in 2011, he appeared in the first two games of the season, recording one tackle, before suffering an injury. He was given a medical redshirt. In 2012, as a redshirt freshman, he appeared mostly on special teams. He recorded nine tackles (eight solo.) and 1.5 tackles-for-loss. As a redshirt sophomore in 2013 he appeared in 13 games (10 starts). He recorded 59 tackles, 2.5 tackles-for-loss, two sacks, one interception and three passes defensed. For the season, he was named All-ACC honorable mention. In 2014 as a redshirt junior, he recorded 86 tackles (53 solo.), 4.5 tackles-for-loss, one sack, two interceptions, one pass defensed and one forced fumble. He was named Second-team All-ACC. During his injury shortened 2015 season, he started nine games, missing four due to an ankle injury. He recorded 64 tackles (33 solo.), 3.5 tackles-for-loss, and one sack. After the season, he appeared in the 2016 East–West Shrine Game.

Career statistics

Professional career

Kansas City Chiefs
After going undrafted in the 2016 NFL Draft, Smith was signed by the Kansas City Chiefs on May 6, 2016. On September 3, he was waived during final cuts. On September 5, he was signed to the Chiefs' practice squad. On November 1, he was promoted to the Chiefs' active roster.

On October 23, 2018, Smith was placed on injured reserve with a knee injury.

Miami Dolphins
On August 11, 2019, Smith was signed by the Miami Dolphins. He was released on August 31, 2019.

Arizona Cardinals
On November 16, 2020, Smith was signed to the practice squad of the Arizona Cardinals. He was elevated to the active roster on December 19, December 25, and January 2, 2021, for the team's weeks 15, 16, and 17 games against the Philadelphia Eagles, San Francisco 49ers, and Los Angeles Rams, and reverted to the practice squad after each game. He signed a reserve/future contract on January 5, 2021. He was released on August 30, 2021.

Ottawa Redblacks 
Smith signed with the Ottawa Redblacks of the Canadian Football League (CFL) on March 22, 2022. Smith was released as part of the team's final roster cuts on June 4, 2022.

Orlando Guardians 
On November 17, 2022, Smith was drafted by the Orlando Guardians of the XFL.

Personal life
Smith is the son of former Clemson wide receiver, Terry Smith.

Smith's cousin is current Arizona Cardinals wide receiver DeAndre Hopkins.

References

External links
 Florida State Seminoles bio
 Kansas City Chiefs bio

1993 births
Living people
People from Decatur, Georgia
Sportspeople from DeKalb County, Georgia
African-American players of American football
Players of American football from Georgia (U.S. state)
American football linebackers
Florida State Seminoles football players
Kansas City Chiefs players
Miami Dolphins players
Arizona Cardinals players
Ottawa Redblacks players
Orlando Guardians players
21st-century African-American sportspeople